Roh Deok (born 1980) is a South Korean film director and screenwriter. Her 2015 film The Exclusive: Beat the Devil's Tattoo has been described as "thoroughly entertaining" by The Korea Herald and her debut Very Ordinary Couple (2013) as containing "uncanny honesty and humor". Very Ordinary Couple also won Asian New Talent Award for Best Feature at the Shanghai International Film Festival in 2013.

Filmography

Film

Television series

Web series

Theater

References

External links 
 
 
 

1980 births
Living people
South Korean film directors
South Korean women film directors
South Korean screenwriters
Seoul Institute of the Arts alumni